The following purported languages of South America are listed as unclassified in Campbell (2012), Loukotka (1968), Ethnologue, and Glottolog. Nearly all are extinct. It is likely that many of them were not actually distinct languages, only an ethnic or regional name.

Campbell (2012)

Campbell (2012:116-130) lists the following 395 languages of South America as unclassified.  Most are extinct. Many were drawn from Loukotka (1968) and Adelaar & Muysken (2004). The majority are not listed in Ethnologue. The list is arranged in alphabetical order.

Aarufi – Colombia
Aburuñe – Bolivia
Acarapi – Brazil
Aconipa (Tabancal, Tabancara) – Ecuador; only 5 words known
Aguano (Awano, Ahuano, Uguano, Aguanu, Santa Crucino) – Peru
Alarua – Brazil
Alon – Peru
Amasifuin – Peru
Amikoana (Amikuân) – Brazil
Amoeca – Brazil
Amuimo – Brazil
Anetine – Bolivia
Angara – Peru
Anicun – Brazil
Anserma (including Caramanta, Cartama) – Colombia
Aparea – Argentina
Apitupá – Brazil
Apiyipán – Bolivia
Aracadaini – Brazil
Arae – Brazil
Aramayu – Brazil
Aramurú – Brazil
Arapoá – Brazil
Arara do Beiradão (Arara do Rio Branco, Arara do Aripuanã) – Brazil
Ararau – Brazil
 – Peru, Colombia (a purported language isolate called "Arda" has no relation, but was a misidentified vocabulary of the West African language Popo (Gen))
Arma-Pozo – Colombia (cf. Arma)
Aroásene – Brazil
Artane – Bolivia
Atavila – Peru
Aticum (Araticum) – Brazil
Atunceta – Colombia
Aueiko – Brazil
Avis – Brazil
Axata Darpa – Paraguay
Ayacore – Peru
Bagua – Peru; only 3 words known
Baixóta – Brazil
Bakurönchichi – Brazil
Bauá – Brazil
Bikutiakap – Brazil
Bixarenren – Brazil
Boimé (Poyme) – Brazil
Bolona – Ecuador
Bracamoro (Papamuru) – Peru
Buritiguara – Brazil
Caapina – Brazil
Cachipuna – Peru
Cafuana – Brazil
Cagua – Colombia
Caguan (Kaguan) – Argentina
Cahan – Brazil
Cajamarca – Peru
Cajatambo – Peru
Camana (Maje) – Peru
Camaraxo – Brazil
Camaré – Brazil
Campaces – Ecuador; possibly Barbacoan, with Tsafiki, but unconfirmed
Canelo – Ecuador
Cañacure – Bolivia
Capueni – Brazil
Capua – Brazil
Cara (Scyri, Caranqui, Otavalo) – Ecuador; possibly Barbacoan
Carabayo (Yuri, "Amazonas Macusa")
Caraguata – Brazil
Carapacho – Peru
Carára – Brazil
Carari – Brazil, Amazonas. A short word-list.
Cararú (Cajurú) – Brazil
Caripó (Curupeche) – Brazil
Cascoasoa – Peru
Casigara – Brazil
Casota – Argentina
Cauacaua (Kawakawa) – Brazil
Cauauri – Brazil
Caucahue – southern Chile
Cauni – Brazil
Caupuna – Brazil
Cavana (Maje) – Peru
Caxago – Brazil
Cayú – Brazil
Ceococe – Brazil
Chachapoya (Chacha) – Peru
Chancay – Brazil
Chechehet ("Pampa") – Argentina; Loukotka (1968) gives the words chivil 'two', chu 'earth', and hati great.
Chedua – Peru
Chicha – Bolivia
Chincha – Peru
Chinchipe – Peru
Chipiajes – Colombia
Chitarero – Colombia
Cholto – Peru
Chongo – Peru
Chono – Chile
Chumbivilca – Peru; possibly a variety of Puquina; might be Aymaran
Chunanawa – Peru
Churima – Bolivia
Chusco – Peru
Ciaman – Colombia
Cognomona – Peru
Colima – Ecuador; possibly Cariban
Comanahua – Peru
Comaní – Brazil
Comechingón – near Córdoba, Argentina; possibly Huarpean
Copallén (Copallín) – Peru; only 4 words known
Coritananhó – Brazil
Coxima (Koxima) – Colombia
Culaycha – Argentina
Cumayari – Brazil
Cumbazá (Belsano) – Peru
Curanave – Brazil
Curi – Brazil
Curiane – northeastern South America; precise location unknown
Curierano – Brazil
Curizeta – Peru
Curubianan – Brazil
Curumiá – Brazil
Curumro (Kurumro) – Paraguay
Curuzirari – Brazil
Cutaguá – Brazil
Cutría – Brazil
Cuximiraíba – Brazil
Cuxiuára – Brazil
Damanivá – Brazil
Dawainomol – Paraguay
Demacuri – Brazil
Diaguita (Cacan, Kakán) – northwest Argentina; subdivisions are Calchaquí, Capayán, Catamarcano, Hualfín, Paccioca [Pazioca], Pular, Quilme, Yacampis
Divihet – Argentina
Dokoro – Brazil
Duri – Brazil
Egualo – Argentina
Eimi – Peru
Emischata – Argentina
Envuelo – Colombia
Erema – Brazil
Ewarhuyana – Brazil; possibly 12 speakers in Pará State
Foklása – Brazil
Gadio – Brazil
Galache – Brazil
Gambéla – Brazil
Gorgotoqui – Bolivia
Goyana – Brazil
Guaca (and Nori) – Colombia
Guacará – Argentina
Guadaxo – Brazil
Guaimute – Brazil
Guajarapo (Guasaroca) – Bolivia
Guanaca – Colombia; possibly a relative of Guambiano (Barbacoan)
Guane – Colombia; possibly Chibchan
Guanarú – Brazil
Guanavena – Brazil
Guarino – Brazil
Guenta – Colombia
Guyarabe – Brazil
Hacaritama – Colombia
Harritiahan – Brazil
Hiauahim (Javaim) – Brazil
Himarimã – Brazil; uncontacted group
Huacavilca – Ecuador; extinct
Huambuco – Peru; might be a misspelling of Huánuco
Huayana – Peru
Huayla – Peru
Humahuaca (Omaguaca) – Argentina; apparent subdivisions are Fiscara, Jujuy, Ocloya, Osa, Purmamarca, Tiliar; Mason (1950:302) proposed an "Ataguitan" grouping that includes Humahuaca, Diaguita, and Atacameño
Iapama – Brazil
Ibabi Aniji – Peru
Idabaez – Colombia; only 1 word and a chief's name are known; Pacific coast, Bahía Solano to Cape Marzo in Colombia (Loukotka 1968)
Imaré – Brazil
Ina – Brazil
Iñajurupé – Brazil
Irra – Colombia
Iruri – Brazil
Isolados do Massaco (?) – Brazil
Isolados do Tanarú (?) – Brazil
Itipuna – Brazil
Itucá (Cuacá) – Brazil
Jacariá – Brazil
Jaguanai – Brazil
Jaguanan – Brazil
Jamundi – Colombia; may be Yurimangui, but no data
Jeticó (Jiripancó) – Brazil
Jitirijiti – Colombia; may be Chocó, but no data
Jurema – Brazil
Juruena – Brazil
Jururu – Brazil
Kaimbé (Caimbé, Caimbe) – Brazil; extinct
Kamba (Camba) – Brazil; possibly Tupian, extinct
Kambiwá (Cambiuá, Cambioá) – Brazil; extinct
Kantaruré – Brazil
Kapinawá – Brazil; extinct
Karahawyana – Brazil; possibly Cariban
Katembri (Kariri de Mirandela) – Brazil
Kiapüre (Quiapyre) – Brazil
Kohoroxitari – possibly Tocanoan; may be the same as Baniwa
Kokakôre – Brazil
Komokare – Brazil
Korubo (Caceteiros) – Brazil; possibly Panoan; may be the same as Marúbo, or related to Yanomámi (Yanomaman)
Koshurái – Brazil
Kururu – Brazil
Lache – Colombia; may be Chibchan, but no data
Lambi – Brazil
Lili – Colombia; may be Yurimangui, but no data
Llamish – Peru
Macamasu – Brazil
Macarú – Brazil
Macuani – Brazil
Macuaré – Brazil
Macuja – Brazil
Macuruné – Brazil
Mairajiqui – Brazil
Malaba – Ecuador; may be Barbacoa (Chibchan), but no data
Malibú – Colombia; possibly Chibchan
Malquesi – Paraguay
Manesono (Mopeseano) – Bolivia
Manta – Ecuador; possibly Chimú, but only a few patronyms are known
Maracano – Brazil
Marapaña – Brazil
Maricoxi – Brazil
Maricupi – Brazil
Maripá – Brazil
Maruquevene – Brazil
Masa – Argentina
Masarari – Brazil
Masaya – Colombia
Mashco – Peru; uncontacted, possibly related to Piro (Arawakan), or "Preandine" (Arawakan)
Matará – Argentina
Maynas (Mayna, Maina, Rimachu) – Peru; past attempts to link it to Jivaroan, Cahuapanan, Zaparoan, and Candoshi
Maxiena (Ticomeri) – Bolivia
Mayu – Brazil; possibly the same as Mayo (Panoan) or Morike (Arawakan); mayu is the Quechuan word for 'river, water'
Menejou – Brazil
Minhahá – Brazil
Miarrã – Brazil
Mocana – Brazil; may be related to Malibú, but only 2 words known
Moheyana – Brazil
Morcote – Colombia; may be Chibchan, but no data
Moriquito – Brazil
Morua – Brazil
Moyobamba (Moyo-Pampa) – Peru
Muriva – Brazil
Muzapa – Peru
Muzo – Colombia; may be Pijao (Cariban), but only 3 words known
Natagaimas – Colombia; extinct
Nacai – Brazil
Nambu – Bolivia
Nauna – Brazil
Nindaso – Peru
Nocadeth – Brazil
Nomona – Peru
Ñumasiara – Brazil
Ocra – Peru
Ocren – Brazil
Ohoma – Argentina; may be the same as Hohoma or Mahoma
Oivaneca – Brazil
Olmos – Peru; possibly connected with Sechura
Onicoré – Brazil
Onoyóro – Brazil
Orí – Brazil
Ortue – Bolivia
Otecua – Peru
Otegua – Colombia
Otí (Eochavante, Chavante) – Brazil; Greenberg classifies it as Macro-Gé, though this is unlikely according to Ribeiro (2006:422)
Pacabuey – Colombia; may be Malibú (Chibchan), but no data
Pacarará (Pakarara) – Brazil
Pacimonari – Venezuela
Paguara – Brazil
Panatagua (Pantahua) – Peru; extinct, possibly Arawakan
Panche – Colombia; possibly Cariban
Pankararé (Pankaré) – Bahía, Brazil; extinct
Pantágora (Palenque) – Colombia
Pao – Venezuela
Papamiän – Brazil
Papana – Brazil
Papavô – Brazil; uncontacted, may be Arawakan or Panoan (?)
Paragoaru – Brazil?
Paraparixana – Brazil
Parapicó – Brazil
Patagón – Peru; possibly Cariban
Patiti – Brazil
Payacú – Brazil
Payanso – Peru
Pehuenche (Peguenche) – Argentina
Peria (Poria) – Brazil
Perovosan – Bolivia
Piapia – Brazil
Pijao (Piajao, Pixao, Pinao) – Colombia
Pipipan – Brazil
Pocoana – Brazil
Porcá – Brazil
Porú (Procáze) – Brazil
Pubenza (Popayan) – Colombia
Puná (Puná Island) – Ecuador
Puquina – Peru, Bolivia, Chile
Quelosi – Argentina
Querandí (Carendie) – Argentina, near Buenos Aires; may be related to Gününa Küne. Loukotka (1968) gives the words zobá 'moon' and afia 'bow'
Quiquidcana (Quidquidcana, Kikidkana) – Peru
Quijo (Kijo) – Ecuador; may be Barbácoa (Chibchan), but only 3 words are known
Quillacinga (Quillasinga) – Ecuador; may be Sebondoy (Chibchan); Fabre (1998:676) reports that the Kamsa (speakers of a language isolate) are descended, at least in part, from the Quillasinga
Quimbaya – Colombia; may be Chocó, but only 1 word is known
Quimbioá – Brazil
Quindío (Quindio) – Colombia
Quingnam – Peru; extinct, possibly the same as Lengua (Yunga) Pescadora of colonial sources; according to Quilter et al. (2010), a list of numbers was recently found
Qurigmã – Brazil
Rabona – Ecuador; possibly Candoshi (Murato), but there are similarities with Aguaruna (Jivaroan)
Roramí (Oramí) – Brazil
Sácata (Sacata, Zácata, Chillao) – Peru; extinct; may be Candoshi or Arawakan, but only 3 words known
Sacosi – Bolivia
Sacracrinha (Sequaquirihen) – Brazil
Sanavirón – Argentina, near Córdova. Loukotka classified it as an isolate, but there is insufficient data to justify this.
Sapeiné – Peru
Seden – Brazil
Siberi – Bolivia
Sintó (Assek, Upsuksinta) – Paraguay
Sinú (Zenú) – Colombia; may be Chocó, but no data
Sipisipi – Peru
Socorino – Bolivia
Stanatevogyet – Paraguay
Supuselo – Argentina
Surucosi – Bolivia
Suruim – Brazil
Tacunbiacu – Bolivia
Taguaylen – Argentina
Tacarúba (Tacarua) – Brazil
Taluhet – Argentina
Tamacosi – Bolivia
Tamaní – Colombia
Tamaquéu – Brazil
Tamararé – Brazil
Tambaruré – Brazil
Taminani – Brazil
Tanquihua – Peru
Tapacurá – Brazil
Tapeba – Brazil
Tapuisú – Brazil
Tarairiú (Tarairiu, Ochucuyana) – Brazil
Tarimoxi – Brazil
Taripio – Brazil, Suriname
Tavúri – Brazil
Tchagoyána – Brazil
Tchicoyna – Brazil
Tegua – Colombia
Tepqui – Peru
Tevircacap – Brazil
Tiboi – Bolivia
Timaná – Colombia; may be Andaquí (Chibchan)
Tingán – Peru
Tingui-Boto – Brazil; extinct; also known as Tingui, Tingui-Botó, Carapató, Karapató
Tobachana – Brazil
Tohazana – Venezuela
Tomata – Bolivia
Tomina – Bolivia
Tonocoté – Argentina, Chaco region
Tororí – Brazil
Truká – Brazil
Tremembé (Teremembé, Taramembé) – Brazil
Tubichaminí
Tucumanduba – Brazil
Tulumayo – Peru
Tupijó – Brazil
Tupiokón – Brazil
Tutura – Bolivia
Uairua – Brazil
Uauarate – Brazil
Uranaju – Brazil
Urucuai – Brazil
Uruma – Brazil
Uru-Pa-In – Brazil
Urupuca – Brazil
Ururi – Brazil, Mato Grosso
Vanherei – Brazil
Vouve – Brazil
Waitaká (Guaitacá, Goyatacá, Goytacaz) – Brazil; subdivisions: Mopi, Yacorito, Wasu, Miri
Wakoná (Wacona, Acona) – Brazil
Walêcoxô – Brazil
Wasu (Waçu, Wassu) – Brazil
Wau – Peru
Xaquese – Bolivia
Xaray – Bolivia
Xibata – Brazil
Xipará – Brazil
Xiroa – Ecuador; mentioned in early sources, and may be a variant spelling of Jívaro
Xokó – Brazil; only 4 words are known; also known as Chocó, Shoco, Shokó, Chocaz
Yalcón – Colombia; may be Andaquí (Chibchan), but no data
Yamesí – Colombia; may be Andaquí (Chibchan), but no data
Yampará – Bolivia
Yaperú (Naperú, Apirú) – Paraguay
Yarí – Colombia; may be a Carijona (Cariban dialect), West Tucanoan, or Huitoto(an)
Yariguí (Yarigüí) – Colombia; may be Opone (Karaib), but no data (Yarigui people)
Yauei – Brazil
Yenmu – Colombia
Yoemanai – Brazil
Yufiua – Brazil
Yumbo – Ecuador; may be Barbácoa (Chibchan), but no data
Zapazo – Peru
Zuana – Brazil
Yurimagua (Zurimagua, Jurimagua) – Peru
Zurina – Brazil

Loukotka (1968)

Loukotka (1968) lists the following languages of South America as unclassified. They are extinct unless otherwise noted.

Southern South America and Chacos Region
Divisions A (South) and B (Chaco) (Loukotka 1968: 63):

Aperea – unknown language of the old mission of Santiago Sánchez in the province of Corrientes, Argentina.
Axata Darpa – unknown language of an unknown tribe of the Gran Chaco of Paraguay.
Casota – unknown language of the old mission of Santa Lucía, Corrientes, Argentina.
Culaycha – unknown language of the old mission of Santa Lucía, Corrientes, Argentina.
Dawainomol – unknown language from the Gran Chaco of Paraguay.
Divihet – Colorado River and Sauce Chico River, province of La Pampa, Argentina.
Egualo – unknown language of the old mission of Santiago Sánchez, province of Corrientes, Argentina.
Emischata – unknown language of the old mission of Santa Lucía, Corrientes, Argentina.
Jaguanan – Iguape, Rio Grande do Sul, Brazil.
Kaguan – mission of Santiago Sánchez, Corrientes, Argentina.
Kurumro – language of an unknown tribe of the Paraguayan Gran Chaco.
Malquesi – western shore of Laguna Porongos, province of Córdoba, Argentina.
Masa – unknown language of the old mission of Santiago Sánchez.
Ohoma – extinct and unknown language near the old mission of Homa or Ohoma, province of Corrientes, Argentina.
Peguenche non-araucano – a lost language of the Neuquén province, Argentina.
Quelosi – unknown language east of the Mar Chiquita, province of Córdoba, Argentina.
Sintó or Assek or Upsuksinta – language of an unknown tribe in the interior of the Gran Chaco of Paraguay, north of the Choroti tribe.
Stanatevogyet – unknown language of the Paraguayan Gran Chaco.
Supeselb – lost language of the old mission of Santa Lucía, Corrientes province.
Taguaylen – lost language of the old mission of Santa Lucía, Corrientes province.

Central Brazil
Division C (Central Brazil) (Loukotka 1968: 86–87):

Arae – unknown language left bank of the Araguaia River south of Bananal Island.
Buritiguara – unknown language state of Mato Grosso near the confluence of the Araguaia River and Manso River.
Cahan – Iguatimí River (Iguatemi River) and Espocil River, state of Mato Grosso.
Curumiá – sources of the Brilhante River, Mato Grosso.
Cutaguá – state of Mato Grosso on the Dourados River.
Gaelio – state of Espirito Santo, exact locality unknown.
Guadaxo – upper course of the Anhandui River, Mato Grosso.
Guaimute – near the falls of Salto Grande, Espirito Santo.
Guariteré – Mato Grosso, exact locality unknown.
Imaré – Taquari River, state of Mato Grosso.
Ina – unknown language, Paranaíba River, Mato Grosso.
Iñajurupé – lost language of the old mission of Gracioso, Goiás state.
Jurema – unknown language of Piauí state, exact locality unknown.
Kokakôre – Mato Grosso state along the Tocantins River.
Komokare – unknown language of Goiás state, exact locality unknown.
Koróge – Pogúbe River (Poguba River), Mato Grosso.
Kururu – state of Mato Grosso on the Carinhanha River.
Macuruné – Mucunis River (Mucuri River ?), state of Minas Gerais.
Papana – between the Doce River and Jequitinhonha River, Minas Gerais.
Urupuca – Urupuca River (Urupaça River), Minas Gerais.
Ururi – state of Mato Grosso, exact location unknown.
Vanherei – sources of the Piquiri River, state of Mato Grosso.
Yaperú or Naperú or Apirú – Paraguay near Asunción.

Northeast Brazil
Division D (Northeast Brazil) (Loukotka 1968: 92–95):

Aconan or Wakoná – originally spoken around Lagoa Comprida and in Penedo; now survivors of the original tribe who speak only Portuguese are found in the city of Porto Real do Colégio.
Anicun – source of the Uruhu River (Uru River) and Dos Bois River.
Apitupá – unknown language, Aquitipi River, Bahia state.
Aramurú – state of Sergipe on the São Francisco River.
Arapoá – around Jaboatão in the state of Pernambuco.
Arariú – unknown language near Meruoca on the Acatajú River, state of Ceará.
Aticum or Araticum – Pernambuco, near Carnaubeira. The survivors now speak only Portuguese.
Avis – unknown language of the state of Pernambuco, valley of the Pajeú River.
Baixóta – now speak Portuguese in the Serra Catolé, Pernambuco.
Boime or Poyme – state of Sergipe near Aracajú on the São Francisco River.
Caimbé – village of Masacara near Mirandela, state of Bahia. The survivors now speak only Portuguese.
Camaraxo – between Ilhéus and Serra dos Aimorés, state of Bahia.
Cambioá – Serra Negra, Pernambuco state.
Cararú or Cajurú – Soroabé Island in the São Francisco River, Pernambuco state.
Caripó or Curupehe – São Francisco River near Boa Vista, Pernambuco.
Caxago – state of Sergipe on the São Francisco River.
Ceococe – São Pedro, Pernambuco and Serra Pão de Açúcar, Pernambuco.
Foklása – state of Pernambuco in the Serra dos Cavalos.
Galache – near Macaubas, state of Bahia.
Gambéla – unknown language near Ourém and São José, Maranhão state.
Guarino – middle course of the Tijuco River, Mato Grosso.
Itucá or Cuacá – originally spoken in the Serra Negra, Pernambuco state. The last survivors now speak only Portuguese.
Jeriticó or Jiripancó – village of Pindaé near Brejo dos Padres in Tacaratu, Pernambuco. Survivors now speak only Portuguese.
Jururu – state of Ceará, but exact location is unknown.
Macamasu – the exact location of which is unknown.
Macarú – village of Brejo dos Padres, Tacaratu. A few survivors now speak only Portuguese.
Mairajiqui – Bahia de Todos os Santos, state of Bahia.
Moriquito – Alagoas state on the lower course of the São Francisco River.
Nacai – Aquitipi River, Bahia.
Ocren – Bahia on the São Francisco River near Salitre.
Orí – Bahia, between the Itapicuru River and Vaza-Barris River.
Pacarará – state of Pernambuco in the Serra Cacaréa and Serra Arapuá.
Parapicó – Serra Comonati, Pernambuco.
Peria or Poria – village of Rodelas, Bahia. A few survivors now speak only Portuguese.
Pipipan – lower course of the Moxotó River, Pernambuco.
Porcá – on Várgea Island in the São Francisco River, Pernambuco.
Porú or Procáze – originally spoken in the Serra Nhumarana and Serra Cassuca, later on the Várgea Islands and Nossa Senhora de O Islands in the São Francisco River. Now probably extinct.
Quiambioá – Serra Negra, Pernambuco.
Qurigmã – the first inhabitants of São Salvador Bay (Salvador, Bahia), state of Bahia.
Romarí or Omarí – originally spoken in the Serra de Pao de Açúcar, state of Pernambuco. Now there are a few survivors with an unknown language in the village of Propriá, Sergipe state.
Sacracrinha or Sequaquirihen – state of Bahia near the mouth of the Salitre River in the São Francisco River.
Tacarúba or Tacarua – island of Soroabé in the São Francisco River, state of Pernambuco.
Tamaquéu – São Francisco River in the state of Pernambuco, at the confluence with the Salitre River.
Tchili – city of Cimbres, Pernambuco.
Teremembe or Tremembé or Taramembé – originally spoken by a tribe on the coast between the mouth of the Monim River and the mouth of the Chorro River (Choró River), state of Ceará.
Tupijó – state of Bahia by the neighbors of the Maracá tribe.
Uruma – state of Sergipe on the São Francisco River.
Vouve – Piancó River, Pernambuco state.
Walêcoxô – unknown language from the city of Cimbres, Pernambuco.
Xibata – unknown language of a tribe in the state of Ceará. Exact location is unknown.

North Central South America
Tropical North Central South America (Loukotka 1968: 165–168):

Aburuñe – Xarayes Lagoon (Pantanal), Bolivia.
Anetine – near Mojos, Bolivia.
Apiyipán – language of an unknown tribe of the Aripuanã River, Amazonas.
Artane – unknown language of Xarayes Lagoon (Pantanal), Bolivia.
Aueiko – Paranaíba River, Mato Grosso.
Bakurönchichi – language of an unknown tribe of the Branco River, Rondônia.
Bikutiakap – unknown language from Brazil, spoken on the right bank of the Pimenta Bueno River.
Bixarenren – Tiucunti River, a tributary of the Jamachiua River, Rondônia.
Cabixi – Steinen River, Mato Grosso.
Cañacure – Mamoré River, Bolivia.
Capua – spoken on the Rolim de Moura River, Rondônia.
Cayú – spoken on the left bank of the Pimenta Bueno River, Rondônia.
Churima – old mission of San José de Maharenos, Beni province, Bolivia.
Cutriá – spoken on the middle course of the Branco River, Rondônia.
Cuximiraíba – spoken at the mouth of the Aripuanã River, Amazonas.
Djupá – spoken on the Ji-Paraná River, Rondônia.
Dokoro – Paranaíba River, Mato Grosso.
Duri – Paranaíba River, Mato Grosso.
Erema – Paranaíba River, Mato Grosso.
Guajarapo or Guasaroca – around Villa María and Santa Ana de Chiquitos, Santa Cruz province, Bolivia.
Hiauahim or Javaim – "a tribe of cannibals" on the middle course of the Tapajós River, Pará state, Brazil.
Iruri – right bank of the Madeira River, between the Maici River and Aripuanã River, Amazonas.
Juruena – spoken on the Juruena River, Mato Grosso.
Kiapüre or Quiapyre – Mequéns River, Rondônia.
Koshurái – language of an unknown tribe on the lower course of the Ji-Paraná River, Amazonas.
Lambi – extinct language between the Branco River and São Miguel River, Rondônia.
Macuarê – spoken on the left bank of the Pimenta Bueno River, Rondônia.
Manesono or Mopeseano – old mission of San Francisco Borja, Beni province, Bolivia.
Marapanã – spoken by an unknown tribe on the right bank of the Uaimberê River (Uimeerê River), a tributary of the Pimenta Bueno River, Rondônia.
Maricoxi – sources of the Branco River, Rondônia.
Maxiena or Ticomeri – Mojos Plains west of the mission of Trinidad, Beni province, Bolivia.
Minhahá – Paranaíba River, Mato Grosso.
Muriva – mouth of the Jamachim River (Jamanxim River) to the Tapajós River, Pará state, Brazil.
Nambu – Guapay River, Santa Cruz province, Bolivia.
Nocadeth – spoken on the Aripuanã River, state of Amazonas.
Onicoré – between the mouths of the Manicoré River and Marmelos River, state of Amazonas.
Onoyóro – Paranaíba River, Mato Grosso.
Ortue – on Xarayes Lagoon (Pantanal), Bolivia.
Papamiän – spoken on the São Simão River, Rondônia.
Paraparixami – between the Manicoré River and Aninde River, Amazonas.
Patiti – Rondônia territory on the Mequéns River.
Perovosan – south of the Xarayes Lagoon (Pantanal), Bolivia.
Piapai – between the Jamachim River (Jamanxim River) and Iriri River, state of Pará.
Sacosi – ancient Puerto de los Reyes, Bolivia.
Siberi – on Xarayes Lagoon (Pantanal), Bolivia.
Socorino – Bolivia.
Surucosi – Bolivia.
Suruim – spoken on the right bank of the Machado River, Rondônia.
Tacunbiacu – between the Guapay River and the Chiquitos Plains, Bolivia.
Tamacosi – Guapay River near La Barranca, Santa Cruz province, Bolivia.
Tamararé – sources of the Juruena River and Galera River, Mato Grosso.
Tambaruré – Rondônia at the mouth of the Apaxoná River.
Tapacurá – Tapacurá-assú River, state of Pará.
Tarimoxi – language of an unknown tribe to the north of the Guratégaja tribe, Rondônia.
Tavúri – Paranaíba River, Mato Grosso.
Tevircacap – spoken on the right bank of the Pimenta Bueno River, Rondônia.
Tiboi – unknown language, exact location unknown, Bolivia.
Ticaõ or Tonore or Chikaõ – language of an unknown tribe on the right bank of the Culiseú River, a tributary of the Xingú River, Mato Grosso.
Tororí – right bank of the Madeira River north of the Parintintin tribe, state of Amazonas.
Tupiokón – unknown language spoken on the Paxiúba River, Mato Grosso.
Urucuai – Corumbiara River, Rondônia.
Xacuruina – Sangue River, Mato Grosso.
Xaquese – Puerto de los Reyes, Bolivia.
Xaray – Xarayes Lagoon (Pantanal), Bolivia.
Yauei – left bank of the Madeira River across from the mouth of the Aripuanã River, state of Amazonas.
Zurina – mouth of the Mamoriá River, Amazonas.

South Central South America
Tropical South Central South America (Loukotka 1968: 178–179):

Alon – Huambo River, department of San Martín, Peru.
Amasifuin – right bank of the Huallaga River, Peru.
Ayacore – Curaray River, Loreto, Peru.
Becaba – department of Loreto near San Miguel, on the Putumayo River.
Bracamoro or Papamuru – near the city of Jaén, department of Cajamarca, Peru.
Chedua – department of San Martín on the Huambo River.
Chinchipe – department of Cajamarca on the Chinchipe River.
Chupacho – Monzón River and Chinchao River, department of Huánuco.
Cognomona – Cognomona region on the upper course of the Huallaga River.
Comanahua – department of Huánuco by the neighbors of the Tepqui tribe.
Cumbazá or Belsano – between Santa Catalina and Yanayacu, department of San Martín.
Curizeta – Cosanga River, Loreto, Peru.
Eimi – language of an unknown tribe that lived on the Napo River, department of Loreto.
Ibabi Aniji – language of an unknown tribe of Peru. (Alvarez 1938)
Muzapa – by the neighbors of the Cognomona tribe in the department of San Martín.
Otecua – spoken on the Sucumbío River, Loreto.
Payanso – Chipurana River, Loreto.
Quidquidcana – department of Huánuco in the Magdalena Valley.
Sapeiné – language of an unknown tribe of the Napo River, Loreto.
Tepqui – Santa María River, Huánuco, Peru.
Tingán – spoken at the mouth of the Monzón River, Huánuco.
Tulumayo – Muna River, Azul River, and Aguaytia River, Huánuco.
Wau – language of an unknown tribe on the Coca River, Loreto.

Central South America
Tropical Central South America (Loukotka 1968: 196–198):

Aarufi – unknown language from the Quebrada de Oksikgnaná, territory of Caquetá, Colombia.
Acarapi – Parime River, territory of Rio Branco, Brazil.
Alarua – between the Japurá River and Auatí-Paraná River, Amazonas state.
Amoeca – language of an unknown tribe living on the Morarô River, state of Amazonas.
Aracadaini – Corodoá River and Aroá River (Arauã River), tributaries of the Cunhuá River (Cuniuá River), state of Amazonas.
Arda – between the Nanay River and the upper course of the Mazán River, Loreto, Peru.
Bauá – Motum River and Corneg River, Amazonas.
Cafuana – Japurá River south of the Wariwa tribe.
Capueni – between the Amazon River and Ixié River, Amazonas.
Caraguara – between the Amazon River and Lake Anama.
Carari – mouth of the Mucoin River (Mucum River ?), Amazonas.
Casigara – mouth of the Juruá River.
Cauacaua or Kawakawa – Japurá River.
Cauni – between the Juruá River and Jutaí River, Amazonas.
Caupuna – mouth of the Purus River.
Cumayari – spoken by an unknown tribe of the Cumayari region.
Curi – Curi region south of the Pariana tribe.
Curuzirari – between the mouths of the Juruá River and Tefé River.
Cuxiuára – right bank of the Purus River near the mouth.
Envuelto – language of an unknown tribe that lived on the Quebrada de Jirijirima, Caquetá territory, Colombia.
Guanarú – Juruá River, north of the Marawa tribe, Amazonas, Brazil.
Guyarabe – between the Amazon River and Auatí-Paraná River, Amazonas.
Itipuna – between the Juruá River and Jutaí River.
Jacariá – Abuna River, territory of Rondônia, Brazil.
Jaguanai – between the mouth of the Japurá River and the Zuana tribe, Rondônia.
Jarauára – unknown language of a tribe living on the Apituán River and Curiá River, tributaries of the Cataichi River, Amazonas.
Macuja – spoken by an unknown tribe on the Poré River, Amazonas.
Mamori – language of an unknown tribe on the Cunhuá River.
Mariman – spoken on the Riozinho River, tributary of the Cunhuá River.
Maripá – Tonantins River, Amazonas.
Maruquevene – between the mouths of the Japurá River and Auatí-Paraná River.
Masarari – south of the Jutaí River, Amazonas.
Mayu – unknown language spoken on the Jaquirana River, tributary of the Javari River, Amazonas.
Morua – Japurá River south of the Maruquevene tribe.
Nauna – Jutaí River south of the Marawa tribe.
Ñumasiara – unknown language spoken on the Giraparaná River and Canamari River.
Paguara – Tefé River.
Pariana – mouth of the Auatí-Paraná River, Amazonas.
Pauana – Cafua River, Amazonas.
Pocoana – between the Amazon River and Lake Maracaparu.
Taiguana – unknown language spoken in the Sierra Araracuára, Caquetá territory, Colombia.
Tamaní – unknown language spoken on the Quebrada de Tamaní in Caquetá territory, Colombia.
Tobachana – between the Juruá River and Juri River south of the Itipuna tribe, state of Amazonas.
Tucumanduba – spoken on the upper course of the Canacau River, a tributary of the Cunhuá River, Amazonas.
Uaia – Içá River west of the Passé tribe.
Uairua – between the Juruá River and Jaracui River.
Uauarate – Jutaí River north of the Catuquina tribe.
Yenmu – unknown language spoken on the Cure River, Amazonas territory, Colombia.
Yoemanai – right bank and at the mouth of the Purus River, Amazonas state, Brazil.
Yufiua – south of the Coeruna tribe on the Japurá River.
Zuana – Amazon River south of the mouth of the Cafua River, state of Amazonas.

Northeast South America
Tropical Northeast South America (Loukotka 1968: 228–230):

Amuimo – language of an unknown tribe that lived on the Nhamundá River, state of Amazonas.
Aramayu – Oiapoque River, Amapá territory, Brazil.
Ararau – unknown language spoken on the Jatapu River, state of Amazonas.
Aroasene – unknown language spoken at the sources of the Nhamundá River and Jatapu River, state of Amazonas.
Caapina – between the Maicuru River and Jari River, state of Pará.
Camare – Camoó River (Camaiú River), a tributary of the Trombetas River, Amazonas.
Carara – sources of the Jatapu River, Amazonas.
Cauauri – south of the Curanave tribe, Amazonas.
Comanl – area north of Lake Saracó, state of Pará.
Coritanaho – Ajubacabo River, a tributary of the Trombetas River, state of Pará.
Curanave – west of the Negro River, Amazonas.
Curiane – language of a tribe the location of which is not known exactly.
Curierano – south of the sources of the Orinoco River, territory of Amazonas, Venezuela.
Curubianan – Urubu River and Jatapu River, Amazonas
Damanivá – spoken on the Igarapé do Pacú; a tributary of the Caratirimani River and in the Serra do Urubu, Rio Branco territory.
Demacuri – spoken on the Caburi River (Cauaburi River) near São Pedro, state of Amazonas.
Goyana – lower course of the Branco River, territory of Rio Branco.
Guanavena – between the Urubu River and Jatapu River, Amazonas.
Harritiahan – middle course of the Matapi River, Amapá territory.
Macuani – Oiapoque River, Amapá territory.
Maniba – unknown language spoken on the Inirida River and Pupunagua River, Vaupés territory, Colombia.
Maracano – unknown language spoken on the central part of Maracá Island, Rio Branco territory, Brazil.
Maricupi – lower course of the Montoura River, Amapá territory.
Menejou – middle course of the Jarí River, Amapá territory.
Mepuri – middle course of the Negro River, south of the Baré tribe, state of Amazonas.
Moheyana – language of an unknown tribe that lived between the Erepecurú River and Acapú River, state of Pará.
Oivaneca – Tartarugal River, Amapá territory, Brazil.
Pacimonari – lower course of the Siapa River, Amazonas territory, Venezuela.
Pao – Pao River, state of Monagas, Venezuela.
Paragoaru – Capó River.
Seden – between the Negro River and Uatumã River, Amazonas.
Taminani – Uaçá River and Curupi River (Curapi River), Amapá territory. All of the last survivors now speak only a French creole dialect.
Tapuisú – mouth of the Maicurú River, Amapá territory.
Taripio – unknown language of an unknown tribe that lived to the north of the Rangú tribe in the frontier area of the Brazilian state of Pará and Dutch Guiana.
Tchagoyána – unknown language spoken between the Erepecurú River and Acapú River, state of Pará.
Tchicoyna – unknown language spoken in the state of Pará, on the Cuátari River.
Tohazana – Venezuela.
Uranaju – middle course of the Araguari River, Amapá.
Waruwádu – language of an unknown tribe that lived between the Ventuari River and Erebato River, state of Bolívar; Venezuela.
Xipará – between the Urubu River and Jatapu River, state of Amazonas.

Northern Andes
Northern Andean region (Loukotka 1968: 259):

Chirú – southwest of the Coiba tribe, Panama.
Escoria – around the city of Santiago, Panama.
Guenta – department of Huila, Colombia.
Masaya – sources of the Caguán River, north of the Guaque tribe.
Natá – on Parita Bay, Panama.
Otegua – department of Huila, Colombia.
Urraca or Esquegua – north of the modern city of Cañazas, Panama.
Yeral – unknown language of Colombia, exact location unknown.

Former Inca Empire region
South Central Andean region (Loukotka 1968: 272–273):

Angara – ancient Inca province of Angara, department of Ayacucho, Peru.
Arequipa – department of Arequipa.
Atavila – ancient province of Canta, department of Lima.
Cachipuna – Puna de Quillpaco, department of Lima.
Cajamarca – around the city of Cajamarca.
Cajatambo – around the city of Cajatambo, department of Lima.
Camana or Maje – Majes River, Arequipa department.
Cavana – middle course of the Majes River, department of Arequipa.
Chachapoya – around the city of Chachapoya, Amazonas department, Peru. (Bandelier 1940, only a few toponyms.)
Chancay – Chancay River, department of Lima.
Chicha – Cordillera de Chorolque, Potosí province, Bolivia.
Chincha – Chincha River in the department of Ica.
Chongo – near the city of Jauja, Junín department.
Chucurpu or Chocorvo – spoken in the Conquest days at the sources of the Churchinga River, Huancavelica department.
Conchuco – around the city of Pomabamba, department of Ancash.
Cutervo or Huambo – sources of the Chancay River, department of Junín.
Huacho – around the city of Huacho, Lima department.
Huamachi – on Chongos Alto, department of Junín.
Huamachuco – Condebamba River, department of Libertad.
Huamalí – Panao River, Huánuco department.
Huamanga – Peru.
Huambuco – Chinchipe River, Amazonas department.
Huanca or Wanka – Mantaro River, Junín department, now Quechuanized.
Huayla – middle course of the Santa River, Ancash department, now Quechuanized.
Hunacabamba – Chamaya River, Piura department.
Ica – Ica River, Ica department.
Lampa – Pativilca River, Ancash department.
Llamish – department of Lima in the Cordillera de Huantán.
Mizque – Mizque River, Cochabamba province, Bolivia; now Quechuanized.
Moquegua – department of Moquegua, Peru; possibly a dialect of Aymara.
Moyobamba – around the city of Moyobamba, San Martín department; now Quechuanized.
Nazca – mouth of the Grande River, Ica department.
Ocro – sources of the Santa River, Ancash department.
Pocra – Peru.
Rimac – spoken in the Conquest days around the capital of Peru, Lima.
Rucana – near Andamarca, Ayacucho department.
Sipisipi – Peru.
Sora – Pampas River, Apurimac department.
Supe – Huaura River, department of Lima.
Tanquihua – around the city of Ayacucho, department of Ayacucho.
Tarapaca – province of Tarapacá, Chile.
Tomata – near the city of Tupiza, Potosí province, Bolivia.
Tomina – between the Mizque River and Pilcomayo River, Chuquisaca province, Bolivia; now Quechuanized.
Tutura – around the city of Totora, Cochabamba province, Bolivia; now Quechuanized.
Yampará – middle course of the Pilcomayo River, Chuquisaca province, Bolivia.
Yauyo – department of Lima, Peru, on the Mala River and Huaco River.

Ethnologue
Ethnologue 17 lists the following languages of South America as unclassified:

 Abishira (Peru)
 Agavotaguerra (Brazil) (evidently one of the Paresi-Waura languages)
 Aguano (Peru)
 Aikanã (Brazil)
 Cagua (Colombia)
 Carabayo (Colombia)
 Chipiajes (Colombia)
 Coxima (Colombia)
 Himarimã (Brazil)
 Iapama (Brazil)
 Kaimbé (Brazil)
 Kamba (Brazil)
 Kambiwá (Brazil)
 Kapinawá (Brazil)
 Karahawyana (Brazil)
 Korubo (Brazil)
 Mato Grosso Arára (Brazil)
 Natagaimas (Colombia)
 Pankararé (Brazil)
 Pijao (Colombia)
 Pumé (Venezuela)
 Shenenawa (Brazil)
 Tapeba (Brazil)
 Tingui-Boto (Brazil)
 Tremembé (Brazil)
 Truká (Brazil)
 Uamué (Brazil) (counted as an isolate, but too poorly attested to classify)
 Wakoná (Brazil)
 Wasu (Brazil)
 Xukurú (Brazil)
 Yarí (Colombia)

Additional languages at Glottolog
In addition to many of the languages above, Glottolog lists the following:

Apoto - lower Amazon, unattested
Cálenche (Cálen) = Fayjatases - Chile, 10 words
Envuelto - Colombia, 9 words
Guachipa(s) - Guachipas, Argentina, 3 words, Viegas Barros (2009)
Guaicaro (Guaïcaro) - Chile, possibly Alacalufan
Hoxa - Colombia
Pacahuaras-Castillo - Pacaguara, collected by Castillo
Payaya - Texas
Pitaguary  - Ceará, Brazil
Quepo(s) - Quepos, Costa Rica, 1 word, Lehmann (1920:238)
Tapajó - 3 words
Tembey - upper Paraná, 2 words, Ambrosetti (1896:332)
Unainuman - Içá River basin, short word list, Adelaar & Brijnen 2014
Urucucú(s) - Tapajós River, unattested (see under Tapajó language)
Yanacona - name is the Quechua word for 'serf'; perhaps early Colombian Quechua

Other
Some additional languages have not made in into the lists above.

Boreal Pehuelche - Argentina, 1 word (apparently not the same as Puelche)
 (Cabixi-Natterer) - Mato Grosso, Brazil, a short word-list. The name 'Kabixí' is a generic name for any hostile group, and has been used for a number of unattested languages. An ISO code for it has been retired.
Enoo - Chile, a few words (a neighbor of the Alacalufe)
Gamela of Viana - Maranhão, Brazil, 19 words (Nimendajú 1937:64) - presumably the same as Gamela

See also
:Category:Unclassified languages of South America
Extinct languages of the Marañón River basin
List of extinct languages of South America
List of extinct languages of North America
List of extinct Uto-Aztecan languages
Classification of indigenous languages of the Americas
Indigenous languages of the Americas
Languages of South America
List of indigenous languages of South America

Brazil
List of indigenous peoples of Brazil
List of indigenous territories (Brazil)

Further reading
Durbin, M.; Seijas, H. (1973). A Note on Panche, Pijao, Pantagora (Palenque), Colima and Muzo. International Journal of American Linguistics, 39:47-51.

References

Languages of South America
Unclassified, South America